Swami Ghanananda may refer to:

Ghanananda (died 1969), represented the Ramakrishna Mission in London
Swami Ghanananda Saraswati (1937–2016), prominent swami of the indigenous Hindu community in Ghana